The 1980–81 Iowa State Cyclones men's basketball team represented Iowa State University during the 1980–81 NCAA Division I men's basketball season. The Cyclones were coached by Johnny Orr, who was in his 1st season. They played their home games at Hilton Coliseum in Ames, Iowa.

They finished the season 9–18, 2–12 in Big Eight play to finish in eighth place. The Cyclones lost in the first round of the Big Eight tournament to Missouri, falling 95-70.

Roster

Schedule and results 

|-
!colspan=6 style=""|Regular Season

|-
!colspan=6 style=""|Big Eight tournament

|-

References 

Iowa State Cyclones men's basketball seasons
Iowa State
Iowa State Cyc
Iowa State Cyc